The Retta Dixon Home was an institution for Aboriginal children in Darwin, Northern Territory, Australia, from 1946 until 1982. It was located on the Bagot Aboriginal Reserve, and run by Aborigines Inland Mission of Australia.

History
The Retta Dixon Home was established in 1946 by the Aborigines Inland Mission of Australia (AIM), now renamed Australian Indigenous Ministries.

Retta Dixon was a woman who in 1896 took over the Petersham Christian Endeavour Society at La Perouse, near Botany Bay in New South Wales, before moving to the Singleton area in the Hunter Valley in 1905, where the Aborigines Inland Mission of Australia was formed. She married Leonard Long and around 1909, AIM set up a centre at Herberton in Far North Queensland.

AIM began working in the Top End in the 1930s. In 1941 an AIM representative was invited to Bagot Aboriginal Reserve to take charge of "part-coloured" or "half-caste" Aboriginal women and children. With the outbreak of World War II the then superintendent, Miss Shankelton, evacuated 72 children to Balaklava in South Australia in 1942. Upon returning to Darwin in 1946, the AIM set up the Retta Dixon Home as an institution to provide care for these children.
 
The Retta Dixon Home was destroyed by Cyclone Tracy in 1974, and is now a vacant block. A memorial plaque marks the location where the home once stood. It reads:
This plaque is in recognition of Aboriginal children displaced from mother and country. Karu Park accommodated a children's institution named Retta Dixon Home. Similar institutions were established at Kahlin, Garden Point, Croker Island and Groote Eylandt. This plaque is dedicated to the memory of those children and their mission workers.

Royal commission into sexual abuse
Allegations of child sexual abuse at the Retta Dixon Home were investigated at the Royal Commission into Institutional Responses to Child Sexual Abuse in 2015. Ten former residents gave evidence, describing their experiences of rape, molestation and abuse at the home.

The findings released on 19 August 2015, found that AIM "did not meet the obligations that it had to children in its care, including protection from sexual abuse". The Commissioners found that AIM did not provide sufficient training to its staff on how to detect or respond to allegations of child sexual abuse.

Compensation
As a result of an out-of-court settlement, 71 people were awarded compensation in 2017.

As of September 2021, a least ten people had applied for compensation under the Australian Government's National Redress Scheme (NRS), which was set up for people who have experienced institutional child abuse. However the government prevented Australian Indigenous Ministries (AIM) from being a participant in the NRS, for the stated reason that the group could not afford to pay out potential claimants. There was a possibility that funding could be drawn from a government body, as a "funder of last resort", during the 2021 review of the scheme. Claimants and the AIM were exploring ways in which AIM could make a meaningful apology to survivors of abuse suffered at the home.

In September 2021, a civil lawsuit brought by a man in his 50s against AIM and the Commonwealth in 2020 for abuse suffered by him at the home was concluded, with compensation paid after agreement was reached in a court-ordered mediation process.

References

Buildings and structures in Darwin, Northern Territory
1946 establishments in Australia
1982 disestablishments in Australia